"Your Love Is King" is a song by English band Sade from their debut studio album, Diamond Life (1984). The song was written by Sade Adu and Stuart Matthewman, and produced by Robin Millar. It was the album's lead single in the UK, released in February 1984, and the third single in the US, released there circa June 1985.

The song became the group's highest-charting single on the UK Singles Chart to date, peaking at number 6. In the US, it reached number 54 on the Billboard Hot 100 chart, number 35 on Billboards Hot Black Singles chart, and number eight on Billboards Adult Contemporary chart. The B-sides of the 12-inch single were included on cassette versions of Diamond Life, with the extended "Smooth Operator/Snake Bite" replacing the original. The song is performed on the Live Aid concert.

English pop singer Will Young covered the song for the soundtrack to the 2004 film Bridget Jones: The Edge of Reason.

Composition
"Your Love is King" was originally published in the key of A Major in  time with a tempo of 90 beats per minute. Adu 's vocals span from A4 to F#5.

The tenor saxophone is played by Stuart Matthewman.

Reception
"Your Love is King" was ranked at number seven on Heavy's list of Top 51 Best Love Songs: The Heavy Power List. Tanya Rena Jefferson of AXS stated, "The jazzy slow swaying song, allows you to feel the smoothness of Sade's voice." Frank Guan of Vulture commented, "There's a special charm to certain early Sade songs where poise and lightness prove compatible with profound commitment, and this song, with its blend of spiritual and physical love, is definitely one of them."

Track listings
UK, US, and Dutch 7-inch single
A. "Your Love Is King" – 3:39
B. "Love Affair with Life" (recorded live) – 4:35

UK and Dutch 12-inch maxi single
A1. "Your Love Is King" – 3:58
B1. "Smooth Operator"/"Snake Bite" – 7:28
B2. "Love Affair with Life" (recorded live) – 4:35

Charts

Weekly charts

Year-end charts

Certifications

References

1980s ballads
1984 songs
1984 debut singles
Epic Records singles
Sade (band) songs
Songs written by Sade (singer)
Songs written by Stuart Matthewman
Soul ballads
Will Young songs